Abdul-Wahed Mohammed (born 30 July 1977) is a Libyan futsal player.

Mohammed played for the Libya national futsal team at the 2008 FIFA Futsal World Cup.

Honors

National Team 
 African Futsal Championship:
 2008
 Arab Futsal Championship:
 2007, 2008

Individual 
 Arab Futsal Championship:
 Top Goal Scorer: 2007

References

1977 births
Living people
Libyan men's futsal players